Map of places in Carmarthenshire compiled from this list
See the list of places in Wales for places in other principal areas.
This is a list of cities, towns and villages in the principal area of Carmarthenshire, Wales.

 

A
Aber-arad,
Abercrychan,
Aber-giar,
Abergorlech,
Abergwili,
Abernant,
Alltwalis,
Ammanford

B
Bancffosfelen,
Bancycapel,
Bancyfelin,
Bethlehem,
Betws,
Blaenycoed
(or Blaen-y-coed; partially in Carmarthenshire),
Blaenwaun,
Brechfa,
Bronwydd,
Bryn,
Brynamman,
Burry Port,
Bynea

C
Caeo or Caio,
Capel Dewi,
Capel Hendre,
Capel Iwan,
Carmarthen,
Carmel,
Carway,
Castell-y-Garreg, 
Cefncaeau,
Cefneithin,
Cenarth,
Cilycwm,
Cross Hands,
Crugybar,
Crwbin,
Cwmamman,
Cwmann,
Cwmbach,
Cwmduad,
Cwmcarnhywel,
Cwmfelin Boeth,
Cwmffrwd,
Cwmgwili,
Cwmhiriaeth,
Cwmisfael,
Cwmmawr,
Cwmpengraig,
Cynhordy,
Cynwyl Elfed,
Cynwyl Gaeo

D
Dafen,
Derwydd,
Drefach,
Dre-fach Felindre,
Dryslwyn,
Dyffryn Cennen

E
Edwinsford,
Eglwyscummin

F
Felinfoel,
Felindre,
Felingwm Isaf,
Felingwm Uchaf,
Ferryside,
Ffarmers,
Fforest, 
Five Roads,
Foelgastell

G
Garnant,
Glanamman,
Gorslas,
Gwernogle,
Gwyddgrug,
Gwynfe

H
Harford,
Hendy,
Henllan Amgoed, 
Henllanfallteg,
Hiraeth,
Horeb

I
Idole

K
Kidwelly

L
Laugharne,
Llanarthney,
Llanboidy,
Llandawke,
Llanddarog,
Llanddeusant,
Llanddowror,
Llandeilo,
Llandovery,
Llandre,
Llandybie,
Llandyfaelog,
Llandysul,
Llanedi (Llanedy),
Llanegwad,
Llanelli,
Llanfair-ar-y-bryn,
Llanfallteg,
Llanfallteg West,
Llanfihangel Aberbythych,
Llanfihangel ar Arth,
Llanfihangel Rhos-y-Corn,
Llanfihangel-uwch-Gwili,
Llanfynydd,
Llangadog,
Llangain,
Llangathen,
Llangeler, 
Llangennech,
Llanglydwen,
Llangunnor,
Llangyndeyrn,
Llangynin,
Llanllawddog,
Llanllwch,
Llanllwni,
Llanmiloe,
Llannon,
Llanpumsaint,
Llansadurnen,
Llansadwrn,
Llansaint,
Llansawel,
Llansteffan,
Llanwinio,
Llanwrda,
Llanybri,
Llanybydder,
Llwynhendy

M
Maesybont,
Manordeilo and Salem,
Meidrim,
Myddfai,
Mynyddcerrig,
Mynydd-y-Garreg

N
Nantgaredig,
Nantycaws,
Newcastle Emlyn (partially in Carmarthenshire),
Newchurch and Merthyr,
New Inn

P
Pantyffynnon,
Parc y Rhos,
Pemberton,
Pembrey and Burry Port Town,
Pencader, 
Pencarreg,
Penceilogi,
Pendine,
Peniel,
Penrhiwgoch,
Pensarn,
Pentrecwrt,
Pentregwenlais,
Pen-y-graig,
Pen-y-groes, 
Plashett,
Pontantwn,
Pont-ar-Gothi,
Pontarsais,
Ponthenri,
Pontwelli,
Pontyates,
Pontyberem,
Porthyrhyd,
Pumsaint,
Pwll,
Pwll Trap

Q
Quarter Bach

R
Red Roses,
Rhandirmwyn,
Rhos,
Rhosamman,
Rhydargaeau,
Rhydcymerau,

S
Sandy,
Saron,
St Clears,
St Ishmael, 
Stradey,
Swiss Valley

T
Talley,
Talog,
Trap (Trapp),
Trelech,
Trimsaran,
Tumble,
Tycroes

U
Upland Arms,
Upper Brynamman

W
Whitland

See also
List of places in Carmarthenshire (categorised)

Carmarthenshire